Soumya Swaminathan (born 2 May 1959) is an Indian paediatrician and clinical scientist known for her research on tuberculosis and HIV. From 2019 to 2022, she served as the chief scientist at the World Health Organization under the leadership of Director General Tedros Adhanom Ghebreyesus. Previously, from October 2017 to March 2019, she was the Deputy Director General of Programmes (DDP) at the World Health Organization.

Early life and education
Swaminathan was born in Chennai, India. Swaminathan is the daughter of "Father of Green Revolution of India", M. S. Swaminathan and Indian educationalist Mina Swaminathan. Swaminathan has two siblings, Madhura Swaminathan, a professor of economics at the Indian Statistical Institute, Bangalore, and Nitya Rao, a senior lecturer in gender analysis in international development at the University of East Anglia.

Swaminathan received an M.B.B.S. from the Armed Forces Medical College in Pune. She has an M.D. in pediatrics from All India Institute of Medical Sciences in New Delhi. She is a Diplomate of National Board from National Board of Examinations. As part of her training, from 1987 to 1989 Swaminathan completed a post-doctoral medical fellowship in neonatology and pediatric pulmonology at the Children's Hospital Los Angeles at the Keck School of Medicine of USC.

Career

Early career
From 1989 to 1990, Swaminathan was a research fellow (registrar) in the Department of Pediatric Respiratory Diseases at the University of Leicester in the United Kingdom.

She then worked as a senior research officer (Supernumerary Research Cadre), Cardiopulmonary Medicine Unit, as well as an adjunct associate clinical professor at the Department of Public Health and Family Medicine at Tufts University School of Medicine in Massachusetts.

In 1992, Swaminathan joined the National Institute for Research in Tuberculosis a/k/a Tuberculosis Research Centre, where she was Coordinator, Neglected Tropical Diseases. She later became the director of the National Institute for Research in Tuberculosis.

From 2009 to 2011, Swaminathan was coordinator of the UNICEF/UNDP/World Bank/WHO Special Programme for Research and Training in Tropical Diseases in Geneva.

Until 2013, she was director, National Institute for Research in Tuberculosis (NIRT) in Chennai.

From August 2015 to November 2017, Swaminathan was director general of the Indian Council of Medical Research (ICMR) and secretary of the Department of Health Research (Ministry of Health & Family Welfare) for the Government of India.

Career with WHO
From October 2017 to March 2019, Swaminathan was Deputy Director-General of the World Health Organization.

In March 2019, Swaminathan became chief scientist of the World Health Organization, where she notably participated in regular twice weekly press briefings on the COVID-19 pandemic. She has urged countries to conduct whole genome sequencing of the SARS-CoV-2 virus more frequently and to upload sequences to the GISAID project.

In the preparations for the Global Health Summit hosted by the European Commission and the G20 in May 2021, Swaminathan was a member of the event's High Level Scientific Panel.

Selected research
Swaminathan's areas of interest are pediatric and adult tuberculosis (TB), epidemiology and pathogenesis, and the role of nutrition in HIV-associated TB.

While at the National Institute for Research in Tuberculosis in Chennai, Swaminathan started a multi-disciplinary group of clinical, laboratory and behavioural scientists studying various aspects of TB and TB/HIV. Swaminathan along with  her  colleagues  were among the first to scale up the use of molecular diagnostics for TB surveillance and care, to undertake large field  trials of community-randomised strategies to deliver TB treatment to underserved populations. She was part of the TB Zero City Project which aimed to create "Islands of elimination" working with local governments, institutions and grassroots associations.

In 2021, Swanminathan was also appointed to the Pandemic Preparedness Partnership (PPP), an expert group chaired by Patrick Vallance to advise the G7 presidency held by the government of Prime Minister Boris Johnson.

Other activities
 Foundation for Innovative New Diagnostics (FIND), Member of the Board of Directors (since 2023)
 Alliance for Health Policy and Systems Research, Member of the Board
 Coalition for Epidemic Preparedness Innovations (CEPI), Non-Voting Member of the Board
 Global Antibiotic Research and Development Partnership (GARDP), Non-Voting Member of the Board of Directors
 Global Coalition Against TB, Member of the Expert Group
 WomenLift Health, Member of the Global Advisory Board

Awards
 1999: XI National Pediatric Pulmonary Conference, Dr. Keya Lahiri Gold Medal for best paper
 2008: Indian Council of Medical Research (ICMR), Kshanika Oration Award
 2009: International Union Against Tuberculosis and Lung Disease, Vice-Chair, HIV section
 2011: Indian Academy of Pediatrics, Fellow
 2011: Indian Association of Applied Microbiologists, Lifetime Achievement Award
 2012: Tamil Nadu Science and Technology Award
 2012: National Academy of Sciences, India, Fellow
 2013: Indian Academy of Sciences, Bangalore, Fellow
 2016: AstraZeneca Research Endowment Award, presented by the National Institute of Pharmaceutical Education and Research, S.A.S. Nagar

Personal life
Swaminathan is married to Ajit Yadav, an orthopedic surgeon.

Selected works and publications

References

Further reading

External links

 Soumya Swaminathan at World Health Organization

1959 births
All India Institute of Medical Sciences, New Delhi alumni
COVID-19 researchers
Fellows of the National Academy of Medical Sciences
HIV/AIDS researchers
Indian Council of Medical Research
Indian expatriates in England
Indian expatriates in the United States
Indian medical researchers
Indian paediatricians
Indian women medical doctors
Keck School of Medicine of USC alumni
Living people
Members of the National Academy of Medicine
Scientists from Chennai
University of Madras alumni
Women pediatricians
World Health Organization officials